2021–22 Albanian Cup was the seventieth season of Albania's annual cup competition, the Albanian Cup. Vllaznia defended the trophy, winning their eighth title in the competition.

Format
Ties were played in a two-legged format similar to those of European competitions. If the aggregate score was tied after both games, the match was decided by extra time and a penalty shoot-out, if necessary.

Preliminary round
In order to reduce the number of participating teams for the First round to 32, a preliminary tournament is played. In contrast to the main tournament, the preliminary tournament is held as a single-leg knock-out competition. The matches were played on 11 September 2021.

|-

|}

Luzi 2008 advanced to the first round.

Labëria advanced to the first round.

First round
All 30 eligible teams of the 2021–22 Kategoria Superiore and 2021–22 Kategoria e Parë will enter in this round along with 6 teams from Kategoria e Dytë. The matches were played on 22 September 2021, 13 and 14 October 2021.

|}

Teuta advanced to the second round.

Partizani advanced to the second round.

Tirana advanced to the second round.

Skënderbeu advanced to the second round.

Bylis advanced to the second round.

Dinamo Tirana advanced to the second round.

Besëlidhja advanced to the second round.

Korabi advanced to the second round.

Vllaznia advanced to the second round.

Laçi advanced to the second round.

Kukësi advanced to the second round.

Kastrioti advanced to the second round.

Flamurtari advanced to the second round.

Egnatia advanced to the second round.

Tomori advanced to the second round.

Pogradeci advanced to the second round.

Second round
All the 16 qualified teams from the First Round progressed to the Second Round. The first legs were played on 3 November 2021 and the second legs took place on 17 and 18 November 2021.

|}

Teuta advanced to the quarter finals.

Partizani advanced to the quarter finals.

Dinamo Tirana advanced to the quarter finals.

Skënderbeu advanced to the quarter finals.

Vllaznia advanced to the quarter finals.

Laçi advanced to the quarter finals.

Egnatia advanced to the quarter finals.

Flamurtari advanced to the quarter finals.

Quarter-finals
All eight qualified teams from the second round progressed to the quarter-finals. The first legs were played on 26 and 27 January 2022 and the second legs took place on 9 and 10 February 2022.

|}

Teuta advanced to the semi finals.

Partizani advanced to the semi finals.

Vllaznia advanced to the semi finals.

Laçi advanced to the semi finals.

Semi-finals
The first legs were played on 30 and 31 March and the second legs were played on 13 April 2022.

|}

Vllaznia advanced to the final.

Laçi advanced to the final.

Final

References

External links

Albanian Cup on soccerway

Cup
Albanian Cup seasons
Albanian Cup